Asura marginatana is a moth of the family Erebidae. It is found in New Guinea.

References

marginatana
Moths described in 1922
Moths of New Guinea